The Coal Act 1938 (C.52) was an Act of the Parliament of the United Kingdom that created the Coal Commission.  Criticized for its inconsistencies, the Act was repealed, by degrees, over the next several decades.

Act
The main purpose of the Act was to create a Coal Commission, consisting of five people (including a chairman) appointed by the Board of Trade. The Commission was required to obey all requests of the Board of Trade that were in the "national interest", making it directly under the control of the government of the day. From 1 July 1942 all unworked coal seams and coal mines came into the control of the Commission, who were tasked with managing them in "the interests efficiency and better organisation of the Coal Mining Industry". The Commission was directly prohibited from engaging in coal mining, and as a result owned all the coal but was not allowed to deal with it.

The Act set a sum of £66,450,000 (worth approximately £ as of ) to be paid to the owners of mines and coal seams as compensation.  The amount was divided up per region so that, for example, a Yorkshire coal owner would claim from the Yorkshire Coalfield division of the Central Valuation Board. The Act was criticised by academics as a piece of socialist legislation passed by a Conservative government, which as a result contained so many amendments, provisos and limitations that it was in many ways unworkable. As an example, the Commission was allowed to open up new underground workings, but was prohibited from disturbing the surface of the ground. It was repealed over several decades by the Coal Industry Nationalisation Act 1946, the Mines (Working Facilities and Support) Act 1966, the Coal Industry Act 1975 and the Coal Industry Act 1994.

Notes

References

United Kingdom Acts of Parliament 1938
Repealed United Kingdom Acts of Parliament
Coal mining law